Borne is a municipality in the district of Salzlandkreis, in Saxony-Anhalt, Germany. Borne was first mentioned in 946; old spellings include Brunone (959), Burnon (973), Burne (1197) and the current spelling, used since 1211. The name derives from the phrase "am Brunnen", "by the spring", in reference to a still-extant natural spring.

References

Municipalities in Saxony-Anhalt
Salzlandkreis